Thomas Spur is a prominent spur extending eastward from Rawson Plateau between Moffett and Tate Glaciers, in the Queen Maud Mountains. Mapped by United States Geological Survey (USGS) from surveys and U.S. Navy air photos, 1960–64. Named by Advisory Committee on Antarctic Names (US-ACAN) for Harry F. Thomas, meteorologist, South Pole Station winter party, 1960.

Ridges of the Ross Dependency
Amundsen Coast